Bjelasnica is a mountain range in the south of Bosnia and Herzegovina, specifically in the municipality of Trebinje. It is located on the right side of the river Trebišnjica. The highest peaks are Motka (1396 m), Ilija (1338 m) and Siljevac (1297 m).

References 

Mountains of Bosnia and Herzegovina